Em Đã Quên Một Giòng Sông is the debut studio album by Vietnamese-American singer Lâm Nhật Tiến, released on January 1, 1997, under the music label Asia Entertainment Inc. With production by Thy Van and Trúc Hồ, the album includes notable songs of Vietnamese overseas music in the 1990s, such as by "Cơn Mưa Hạ" and "Mưa Tình Cuối Đông".

Music and production 
All tracks were written by famous Vietnamese songwriters, including Phạm Duy, Trịnh Công Sơn, Anh Bằng, and Ngọc Trọng. The title track "Em Đã Quên Một Giòng Sông", one of Lam's best-known songs, was performed on Asia Video: Hoa & Nhạc in 1996. The song has since been was covered by Vietnamese singers, such as Dam Vinh Hung (in the album Mr. Dam and printed on the cover to be allegedly composed by songwriter Hai Trieu), Bao Yen, Quang Linh, and Ngọc Sơn.

Track listing

References 

1997 debut albums
Lâm Nhật Tiến albums
Vietnamese-American culture